Crazy Noise is the 1989 debut album by New Haven, Connecticut rapper and producer Stezo.  After being a dancer for hip-hop group EPMD, Stezo signed a solo record deal with Sleeping Bag Records and recorded this debut album.  It features two charting singles: "Freak the Funk" and "It's My Turn".  "It's My Turn" was the first recorded sample of the drum break in the Skull Snaps song "It's a New Day".  This break would become one of the most commonly sampled drum breaks for hip-hop music in the 1990s.

Track listing 
"Bring the Horns" - 4:07
"Freak the Funk" - 3:27
"Talking Sense" - 3:20
"It's My Turn" - 3:43
"Getting Paid" - 3:50
"Girl Trouble" - 3:29
"To the Max" - 3:48
"Put Your Body Into It" - 3:32
"Jimmy's Gettin' Funky" - 3:42
"Crazy Noise" - 4:05
"Gets into His Move" - 3:30
"Going for Mine" - 3:08

Singles

References

1989 debut albums
Hip hop albums by American artists
East Coast hip hop albums
Sleeping Bag Records albums